William S. Gilliland Log Cabin and Cemetery is a historic home and family cemetery located in Charleston, West Virginia.  It was the home and graveyard of one of Charleston's oldest families, the Gillilands.  They built the log cabins and lived there until selling it to the Neale family in 1868.

It was listed on the National Register of Historic Places in 1984 as part of the South Hills Multiple Resource Area.

References

Houses in Charleston, West Virginia
Cemeteries on the National Register of Historic Places in West Virginia
Houses completed in 1847
Houses on the National Register of Historic Places in West Virginia
Log cabins in the United States
National Register of Historic Places in Charleston, West Virginia
1847 establishments in Virginia
Log buildings and structures on the National Register of Historic Places in West Virginia